Aerosmith is an American Grammy Award-winning hard rock band formed in 1970 in Boston, Massachusetts. They have released 15 studio albums: Aerosmith (1973), Get Your Wings (1974), Toys in the Attic (1975), Rocks (1976), Draw the Line (1977), Night in the Ruts (1979), Rock in a Hard Place (1982), Done with Mirrors (1985), Permanent Vacation (1987), Pump (1989), Get a Grip (1993), Nine Lives (1997), Just Push Play (2001), Honkin' on Bobo (2004), and Music from Another Dimension! (2012). Each album was released by either the Columbia Records or Geffen Records record label.

Aerosmith has received ten MTV Video Music Awards and rank as the ninth most awarded artist (and the third most awarded group) of all time at that awards ceremony. Aerosmith is also the most awarded artist of all time in the categories Best Rock Video (with four such awards) and Viewer's Choice (with three such awards). Aerosmith has also won once each in the categories Video of the Year, Best Group Video, and Best Video from a Film. They have also received four Grammy Awards, all in the "Best Rock Performance by a Duo or Group with Vocal" category, for the songs "Janie's Got a Gun", "Livin' on the Edge", "Crazy", and "Pink" during four different ceremonies in 1990, 1994, 1995, and 1999, respectively. Aerosmith is second only to U2 in the number of awards won in that category. The band has been recognized in their native Boston, receiving the awards for "Outstanding Rock Band" and "Best Rock Video" in 1992 from the Boston Music Awards. Aerosmith has also collected six American Music Awards, four Billboard Music Awards, two People's Choice Awards, and many other awards and honors. Overall, Aerosmith has received 32 awards from 79 nominations.

ASCAP Pop Music Awards
The annual ASCAP Pop Music Awards honors the songwriters and publishers of the most performed pop songs.

|-
|align="center"|2002
| "Jaded"
| Most Performed Song
|

American Music Awards
The American Music Awards is an annual awards ceremony created by Dick Clark in 1973. Aerosmith has received six awards from ten nominations.

|-
|align="center"|  || Aerosmith || Favorite Heavy Metal/Hard Rock Artist || 
|-
|align="center" rowspan="3"|  ||rowspan="2"| Aerosmith || Favorite Pop/Rock Band, Duo, or Group || 
|-
| Favorite Heavy Metal Artist || 
|-
| Pump || Favorite Heavy Metal/Hard Rock Album || 
|-
|align="center" rowspan="2"|  ||rowspan="2"| Aerosmith || Favorite Pop/Rock Band/Duo/Group  || 
|-
| Favorite Heavy Metal/Hard Rock Artist || 
|-
|align="center"|  || Aerosmith || Favorite Pop/Rock Band, Duo, or Group || 
|-
|align="center"|  || Aerosmith || Favorite Pop/Rock Band || 
|-
|align="center"|  || Aerosmith || International Artist Award ||

BMI Pop Awards
Broadcast Music, Inc. (BMI) is one of three United States performing rights organizations, along with ASCAP and SESAC. It collects license fees on behalf of songwriters, composers, and music publishers and distributes them as royalties to those members whose works have been performed.

|-
| 2002
| "Jaded"
| Award-Winning Song
|

Billboard Music Awards
The Billboard Music Awards are sponsored by Billboard magazine and is held annually in December. Aerosmith has received four awards from five nominations.

|-
|align="center"| 1990 || Aerosmith || Rock Album Artist || 
|-
|align="center"| 1994 || Aerosmith || #1 Rock Artist || 
|-
|align="center"| 1998 || "Pink" || Best Clip (Hard Rock/Metal) || 
|-
|align="center"| 1999 || Aerosmith || Artist Achievement Award || 
|-
|align="center"| 2001 || "Jaded" || Best Hard Rock Clip of the Year ||

Boston Music Awards
The Boston Music Awards are an annual awards show held in Boston, Massachusetts. Aerosmith has received two awards from six nominations.

|-
|align="center" rowspan="2"| 1992 ||rowspan="2"| Aerosmith || Outstanding Rock Band || 
|-
| Best Rock Video || 
|-
|align="center" rowspan="3"| 1999 || "I Don't Want to Miss a Thing" || Video of the Year || 
|-
|rowspan="2"| Aerosmith || Act of the Year || 
|-
| Rock Band of the Year || 
|-
|align="center"| 2001 || "Angel's Eye" || Single of the Year ||

GAFFA Awards

Denmark GAFFA Awards
Delivered since 1991, the GAFFA Awards are a Danish award that rewards popular music by the magazine of the same name.

!
|-
| rowspan="2"| 1994
| rowspan="2"| Aerosmith
| Foreign Name
| 
| style="text-align:center;" rowspan="2"|
|-
| Foreign Live Name
| 
|-
|}

Grammy Awards
The Grammy Awards are awarded annually by the National Academy of Recording Arts and Sciences of the United States. Aerosmith has received four awards from 17 nominations.

|-
|align="center"|  || "Love in an Elevator" || Best Rock Performance by a Duo or Group with Vocal || 
|-
|align="center"|  || "Janie's Got a Gun" || Best Rock Performance by a Duo or Group with Vocal || 
|-
|align="center" rowspan="4"|  || rowspan="2"| "Livin' on the Edge" || Best Rock Performance by a Duo or Group with Vocal || 
|-
| Best Rock Song || 
|-
| "Cryin'" || Best Rock Song || 
|-
| "Boogie Man" || Best Rock Instrumental Performance || 
|-
|align="center"|  || "Crazy" || Best Rock Performance by a Duo or Group with Vocal || 
|-
|align="center" rowspan="2"|  || "Falling in Love (Is Hard on the Knees)" || Best Rock Performance by a Duo or Group with Vocal || 
|-
| Nine Lives || Best Rock Album || 
|-
|align="center" rowspan="3"|  || rowspan="2"| "Pink" || Best Rock Performance by a Duo or Group with Vocal || 
|-
| Best Music Video, Short Form || 
|-
| "I Don't Want to Miss a Thing" || Best Pop Performance by a Duo or Group with Vocal || 
|-
|align="center" rowspan="4"|  || rowspan="2"| "Jaded" || Best Rock Performance by a Duo or Group with Vocal || 
|-
| Best Rock Song || 
|-
| "Fly Away From Here" || Best Music Video, Short Form || 
|-
| Just Push Play || Best Rock Album || 
|-
|align="center"|  || "Girls of Summer" || Best Rock Performance by a Duo or Group with Vocal || 

Aerosmith will be honored as MusiCares Person of the Year in 2020.

MTV Europe Music Awards
The MTV Europe Music Awards is an annual awards ceremony established in 1994 by MTV Europe. Aerosmith has received two awards.

|-
|rowspan="3" align="center"| 1994 || rowspan="2"| Aerosmith || Best Rock || 
|-
|Best Group || 
|-
|"Cryin'" || Best Song || 
|-
|rowspan="2" align="center"| 1997 || rowspan="2"| Aerosmith || Best Rock || 
|-
| Best Live Act || 
|-
|align="center"| 1998 || Aerosmith || Best Rock ||

MTV Movie Awards
The MTV Movie Awards is a film awards show presented annually on the MTV television network. Aerosmith has received one nomination.

|-
|align="center"| 1999 || "I Don't Want To Miss A Thing" || Best Song ||

MTV Video Music Awards
The MTV Video Music Awards is an annual awards ceremony established in 1984 by MTV. Aerosmith has received 10 awards from 36 nominations.

|-
|align="center" rowspan="2"|  ||rowspan="2"| "Dude (Looks Like a Lady)" || Best Group Video || 
|-
| Best Stage Performance in a Video || 
|-
|align="center"|  || "Rag Doll" || Best Heavy Metal Video || 
|-
|align="center" rowspan="8"|  ||rowspan="8"| "Janie's Got a Gun" || Best Metal/Hard Rock Video || 
|-
| Viewer's Choice || 
|-
| Video of the Year || 
|-
| Best Group Video || 
|-
| Best Direction in a Video || 
|-
| Best Art Direction in a Video || 
|-
| Best Editing in a Video || 
|-
| Best Cinematography in a Video || 
|-
|align="center" rowspan="2"|  || "The Other Side" || Best Metal/Hard Rock Video || 
|-
| Things That Go Pump in the Night || Best Long Form Video || 
|-
|align="center" rowspan="6"|  ||rowspan="6"| "Livin' on the Edge" || Viewer's Choice || 
|-
| Video of the Year || 
|-
| Best Metal/Hard Rock Video || 
|-
| Breakthrough Video || 
|-
| Best Special Effects in a Video || 
|-
| Best Art Direction in a Video || 
|-
|align="center" rowspan="9"|  ||rowspan="4"| "Cryin'" || Video of the Year || 
|-
| Viewer's Choice || 
|-
| Best Group Video || 
|-
| Best Metal/Hard Rock Video || 
|-
|rowspan="5"| "Amazing" || Best Direction in a Video || 
|-
| Best Special Effects in a Video || 
|-
| Best Art Direction in a Video || 
|-
| Best Editing in a Video || 
|-
| Best Cinematography in a Video || 
|-
|align="center"|  || "Falling in Love (Is Hard on the Knees)" || Best Rock Video || 
|-
|align="center" rowspan="4"|  ||rowspan="2"| "Pink" || Best Rock Video || 
|-
| Best Special Effects in a Video || 
|-
|rowspan="2"| "I Don't Want to Miss a Thing" || Best Video from a Film || 
|-
| Best Editing in a Video || 
|-
|align="center" rowspan="3"|  ||rowspan="3"| "Jaded" || Best Rock Video || 
|-
| Best Art Direction in a Video || 
|-
| Best Cinematography in a Video ||

MTV Video Music Brazil
The MTV Video Music Brazil (VMB) are MTV Brazil's annual award ceremony, established in 1995.

|-
|align="center"| 2002 || "Fly Away from Here" || Best International Video ||

People's Choice Awards
The People's Choice Awards is an awards show that has been held annually since 1975. Aerosmith has received two awards.

|-
|align="center"| 1994 || Aerosmith || Favorite Rock Group || 
|-
|align="center"| 1999 || Aerosmith || Favorite Musical Group ||

Soul Train Music Awards
The Soul Train Music Awards is annual award show that honors the best in black music and entertainment. It has been held annually since 1987. Aerosmith has received one award, which they shared with Run-D.M.C.

|-
|align="center"| 1987 ||  "Walk This Way" (Run-D.M.C. and Aerosmith) || Best Rap – Single ||

Teen Choice Awards
The Teen Choice Awards is an awards show presented annually by the Fox Broadcasting Company. Aerosmith has received two awards.

|-
|align="center"| 1999 || "I Don't Want to Miss a Thing" || Choice Love Song || 
|-
|align="center"| 2001 || "Jaded" || Choice Rock Track ||

Tony Awards 
The Antoinette Perry Award for Excellence in Theatre, more commonly known informally as the Tony Award, recognizes achievement in live Broadway theatre. The awards are presented by the American Theatre Wing and The Broadway League at an annual ceremony in New York City.

ZD Awards 
 Zvukovaya Dorozhka  ("sound track") is  Russia's oldest hit parade in field of popular music. Since 2003 it is presented in a ceremony in concert halls. It’s considered one of the major Russian music awards.

!
|-
| 2015
| Blue Army Tour (live at Lubyanka Square)
| Tour of the Year
| 
| style="text-align:center;" |
|-
|}

References

External links
 Aerosmith official website

Awards
Lists of awards received by American musician
Lists of awards received by musical group